The Association of Families of Flight PS752 Victims is not-for-profit organization that represents the families of 140 of the victims of the downing of Flight PS752 of Ukrainian International Airlines. The association is independent, with no ties to any political parties or movements; it has been established to keep the memories of the passengers alive, unite the grieving families of victims, and seek justice after flight PS752 was targeted by the Iranian Revolutionary Guard Corps (IRGC).

The association has received support from world politicians including Justin Trudeau the prime minster of Canada.

Mission

This Association has published an investigative Fact-Finding Report for the downing PS752 flight. Some disputable and controversial evidence such as “deliberate opening of the Iranian sky in a war condition”, “the changes in other flights’ routes”, “full destruction of passengers’ electronic devices”, “suspicious 57 minutes’ delay for taking off”, and “off-boarding few passengers” have all been pointed out within that report. After releasing this investigative report, the Association announced its intention to bring the case to the International Court of Justice.

Protests against the crime and worldwide rallies for justice as well as holding virtual anniversaries in memory of the Ukrainian flight victims are among other activities of the Association.

Passengers 

According to the speaker of the Iranian national aviation agency, the number of victims was 176, including 167 passengers and 9 flight crew.

According to Iranian officials, 146 passengers used Iranian passports to leave Iran, and most of them were heading back to Canada via Ukraine after their winter holidays. According to Ukrainian foreign minister Vadym Prystaiko and a flight manifest released by UIA, out of the 167 passengers, 82 were confirmed to be Iranian citizens, while 63 were Canadians. According to Iranian nationality law, the Iranian government considers dual citizens to be solely Iranian citizens. Canadian prime minister Justin Trudeau stated that out of 167 passengers on the plane, 138 were traveling to Canada. This tragedy was the biggest Canadian casualty of aviation incidents since the bombing of flight 182 of the Indian airways in 1985.

Of the 167 passengers, 70 were men, 81 women, 15 children, and one infant.

See also 

 Ukraine International Airlines Flight 752
 Passengers and crew

External links

References 

Non-profit organisations based in Iran
Non-profit organizations based in Canada